Phoenix Tavita Hunapo-Nofoa (born 21 August 1994) is currently playing for Tweed Heads Seagulls.

He is a former Samoan Rugby union and Touch football player. He has previously played for 's sevens team and represented New Zealand in Touch football.

Hunapo-Nofoa played for New Zealand's Touch football team in the Mixed Open category at the 2015 Touch Football World Cup. He made his début for Samoa's sevens team at the 2015 Dubai Sevens. Hunapo-Nofoa made the Warriors development squad after high school.

References 

1994 births
Living people
Bradford Bulls players
Male rugby sevens players
Rugby articles needing expert attention
Samoa international rugby sevens players
Samoan rugby league players
Samoan sportsmen
Touch footballers
Tweed Heads Seagulls players